Jarnosse is a commune in the department of Loire in the Auvergne-Rhône-Alpes Region of central France.

Population

See also
Communes of the Loire department

References

Communes of Loire (department)